Ernest or Ernie Walker may refer to:

 Ernest Walker (composer) (1870–1949), British composer
 Ernie Walker (baseball) (Ernest Robert Walker, 1890–1965), American Major League Baseball outfielder
 Ernie Walker (football) (Ernest John Munro Walker, 1928–2011), Scottish football administrator
 Ernie Walker (footballer) (Ernest Edwin D. Walker, 1889–1958), English footballer
 Jimmy Walker (country musician) (Ernest Earl Walker, 1915–1990), American country musician